Toulon Métropole Var Handball is a women's handball club based in Toulon, France. The team is currently competes in the French Women's Handball First League from 2009 and they play their home matches in Palais des Sports de Toulon, Toulon.

History 
The club was founded in 2005 as a result of an association (an entente) between "Toulon Var Handball", playing in the elite handball league, and "HOC Saint-Cyr-sur-Mer", the 2005 champion of the second highest level league (Division 2) : "Entente Toulon/Saint-Cyr". Summer 2007, the 2 clubs fully merged to become "Toulon Saint-Cyr Var Handball". The club changed its name to "Toulon Métropole Var Handball" for the 2021/2022 season; they changed their logo too.

Honours 

Championnat de France:
Winners (1): 2010
Coupe de France:
Winners (2): 2011, 2012

Team

Current squad 
Squad for the 2022-23 season

Goalkeeper
 12  Charlène Servant 
 16  Ophélie Tonds
 71  Amandine Balzinc
LW
 21  Mélanie Jobard 
 23  Eden Julien
RW 
 8  Manon Pellerin
 44  Elise Caramello
Line players
 6  Mie Sando
 88  Camille Mandret

LB
 7  Malin Holta
 9  Armina Isić
CB
 3  Maria Wierzba
RB
 5  Đurđina Malović 
 5  Chloé Pugliese

Transfers
Transfers for the 2023-24 season 

Joining
  Elise Skinnehaugen (RB) (from  Molde Elite)

Leaving

External links 
 Official website

French handball clubs
Sport in Toulon
Handball clubs established in 2005